France competed at the 2022 World Aquatics Championships in Budapest, Hungary from 18 June to 3 July.

Medalists

Artistic swimming 

France entered 10 artistic swimmers.

Women

Diving

France entered 5 divers.

Men

Women

Mixed

Open water swimming

France entered 7 open water swimmers ( 4 male  and 3 female)

Men

Women

Mixed

Swimming

France entered 21 swimmers.
Men

Women

 Legend: (*) = Swimmers who participated in the heat only.

Water polo 

Summary

Women's tournament

Team roster

Group play

Playoffs

Quarterfinals

5–8th place semifinals

Seventh place game

References

Nations at the 2022 World Aquatics Championships
2022
World Aquatics Championships